Robin Kamber (born 15 February 1995) is a Swiss professional footballer who plays as a midfielder for Polish Ekstraklasa club Górnik Zabrze.

Club career
Kamber spent his youth career at Basel and for a short time at Red Bull Salzburg. Kamber was a part of Basel's 2013–14 UEFA Youth League campaign, where he scored against Chelsea in a home match. In February 2015, he moved from Basel U21s to Servette and there, on 4 March 2015, he made his debut for the first team in the away game against Lausanne-Sport. He came on in the 64th minute for Alexandre Pasche. He scored his first goal for Servette in the 1–0 away win over Biel-Bienne, when he scored the winning goal shortly before the final whistle. At the end of the season, he came to a total of 14 appearances and three goals.

After his loan at Servette ended on 30 June 2015, Kamber joined Vaduz, signing a contract for three years until 30 June 2018. He made his debut on matchday 4 against FC Sion, where he came on as a substitute for Markus Neumayr. On 4 May 2016, he and his team won the Liechtenstein Football Cup, following a 11–0 final victory against Schaan. For the 2016–17 season, Kamber moved on loan to Winterthur in the Challenge League.

On 11 January 2022, Kamber signed with Lausanne-Ouchy.

On 16 August 2022, Kamber moved to Poland to join Ekstraklasa side Górnik Zabrze on a two-year contract with an extension option.

Honours
FC Vaduz
Liechtenstein Football Cup: 2015–16

References

Living people
1995 births
Association football midfielders
Swiss men's footballers
Switzerland youth international footballers
Swiss Super League players
Swiss Challenge League players
Croatian Football League players
Ekstraklasa players
III liga players
FC Basel players
Servette FC players
FC Vaduz players
FC Winterthur players
Grasshopper Club Zürich players
NK Slaven Belupo players
FC Wil players
FC Stade Lausanne Ouchy players
Górnik Zabrze players
Swiss expatriate footballers
Swiss expatriate sportspeople in Liechtenstein
Expatriate footballers in Liechtenstein
Swiss expatriate sportspeople in Croatia
Expatriate footballers in Croatia
Swiss expatriate sportspeople in Poland
Expatriate footballers in Poland
Footballers from Basel